Jarkko Värttö (born 24 February 1989) is a Finnish football player currently playing for IFK Mariehamn.

References

1989 births
Living people
Finnish footballers
Grankulla IFK players
FC Lahti players
IFK Mariehamn players
Ykkönen players
Veikkausliiga players
Association football defenders
Footballers from Espoo